Gerald "Jerry" Neal Williamson (April 17, 1932 – December 8, 2005) was an American horror writer and editor known under the name J. N. Williamson. Born in Indianapolis, Indiana he graduated from Shortridge High School.  He studied journalism at Butler University.  He published his first novel in 1979 and went on to publish more than 40 novels and 150 short stories.  In 2003 he received a lifetime achievement award from the Horror Writers of America. He edited the critically acclaimed How to Write Tales of Horror, Fantasy & Science Fiction (1987) which covered the themes of such writing and cited the writings of such writers as Robert Bloch, Lee Prosser, Richard Matheson, Ray Bradbury, H. P. Lovecraft, August Derleth, William F. Nolan, and Stephen King. Many important writers in the genre contributed to the book. Williamson edited the popular anthology series, Masques. Some of his novels include The Ritual (1979), Playmates (1982), Noonspell (1991), The Haunt (1999), among others.

In 1946, Williamson founded The Illustrious Clients of Indianapolis, a Sherlock Holmes scion society of the Baker Street Irregulars.

Williamson recalled in a 2003 interview that his first work of fiction was a Sherlock Holmes pastiche called "The Terrible Death of Crosby, The Banker."

Bibliography

Series

Martin Ruben
 The Ritual (1979)
 Premonition (1981)
 Brotherkind (1982)

Lamia Zacharias
 Death-Coach (1981)
 Death-Angel (1981)
 Death-School (1982)
 Death-Doctor (1982)

Novels
 The Houngan (1980)
 The Offspring (1980)
 The Tulpa (1980)
 Horror House (1981)
 The Banished (1981)
 Ghost Mansion (1981)
 Queen of Hell (1981)
 The Evil One (1981)
 Playmates (1982)
 Extraterrestrial (1982) (writing as Julian Shock)
 Horror Mansion (1982)
 Nevermore (1983)
 The Hour (1983)
 The Dentist (1983)
 Ghost (1984)
 Babel's Children (1984)
 The Longest Night (1985)
 Ladies of the Longest Night (1985)
 Wards of Armageddon (1986) (with John Maclay)
 Evil Offspring (1987)
 Noonspell (1987)
 Dead to the World (1988)
 They Never Even See Me (1989)
 The Black School (1989)
 Shadows of Death (1989)
 Hell Storm (1990)
 The Night Seasons (1991)
 The Monastery (1992)
 Don't Take Away the Light (1993)
 The Book of Webster's (1993)
 Bloodlines (1994)
 Spree (1998)
 The Haunt (1999)
 Affinity (2001)

Collections
 The New Devil's Dictionary: Creepy Cliches and Sinister Synonyms (1985)
 The Naked Flesh of Feeling (1991)
 The Fifth Season (1994)
 Frights of Fancy (2000)

Anthologies
 Masques: All-New Works of Horror and the Supernatural (1984)
 Masques 2 (1987)
 The Best of Masques (1988)
 Masques 3 (1989)
 Flesh Creepers (1990)
 Masques 4 (1991)
 Dark Masques (2001)
 Darker Masques (2002)
 Masques V (2006)

Short stories
 House Mothers (1984)
 The Gap Nearly Closed Today (1985)
 The Book of Webster's (1986)   
 The Night Seasons (1986)
 Privacy Rights (1987)
 Wordsong (1987)  
 Fancy That (1988)  
 Overnight Pass (1989) (with John Maclay)   
 Monstrum (1989)
 Stories for All Seasons (1989)
 The Sudd (1989)
 The Unkindest Cut (1989)
 You'd Better Watch Out (1989) 
 The Bridge People (1990) 
 Happier Endings (1990) 
 Something Extra (1990) (with James Kisner)   
 Frankenstein Seen in the Ice of Extinction (1993)   
 Goddam Time (1993) (with Scott Fogel)  
 Reality Function (1993)
 Beasts in Buildings, Turning 'Round (1995) 
 High Concept (1995)
 The Last Link Between Life and Death (1995) 
 Origin of a Species (1995)
 Vladimir's Conversions (1995)  
 Hildekin and the Big Diehl (1996)  
 Two Hands Are Better Than One (1996)  
 It Does Not Come Along (1997)

Non fiction
 How to Write Tales of Horror, Fantasy and Science Fiction (1987)

Anthologies containing stories by J. N. Williamson
 Masques: All New Works of Horror and the Supernatural (1984)
 Best of the Horror Show: An Adventure in Terror (1987)
 Masques 2 (1987)
 Whispers VI (1987)
 Fantasy Tales: Vol. 10 - No. 1 (1988)
 Hot Blood: Tales of Provocative Horror (1989)
 Masques 3 (1989)
 Scare Care (1989)
 Urban Horrors (1990)
 The Year's Best Fantasy and Horror Third Annual Collection (1990)
 Hotter Blood: More Tales of Erotic Horror (1991)
 100 Ghastly Little Ghost Stories (1992)
 Dark Seductions: Tales of Erotic Horror (1993)
 Frankenstein: The Monster Wakes (1993)
 Monsters in Our Midst (1993)
 Predators (1993)
 Celebrity Vampires (1995)
 Night Screams (1995)
 Seeds of Fear (1995)
 Vampire Detectives (1995)
 Werewolves (1995)
 Fear the Fever (1996)
 The Giant Book of Fantasy Tales (1996)
 White House Horrors (1996)
 Terminal Frights (1997)

References

External links

Too Much Horror Fiction
 

1932 births
2005 deaths
20th-century American novelists
21st-century American novelists
American horror writers
American male novelists
Butler University alumni
Writers of books about writing fiction
Writers from Indianapolis
American male short story writers
20th-century American short story writers
21st-century American short story writers
20th-century American male writers
21st-century American male writers
Novelists from Indiana